Göztepe Pier is a passenger ferry terminal in west Konak, İzmir, on the Gulf of İzmir. Located along the Mustafa Kemal Coastal Boulevard, it is among the smallest ferry piers in İzmir, along with Bayraklı Pier. İzdeniz operates frequent commuter ferry service to Karşıyaka, Alsancak, Konak and Üçkuyular.

Göztepe Pier was built in 1884 by the first public ferry company in İzmir, Hamidiyye. Connection to ESHOT Bus service on Mustafa Kemal Coastal Boulevard is available, along with tram service at Güzelyalı station.

Connections
ESHOT operates city bus service on Mustafa Kemal Coastal Boulevard.

References

Transport in İzmir
Ferry terminals in Turkey
Buildings and structures in İzmir
1884 establishments in the Ottoman Empire
Buildings and structures completed in 1884
Konak District
19th-century architecture in Turkey